Alastair Galbraith (born 1965) is a New Zealand musician and sound artist from Dunedin.

Career
Galbraith's first band was The Rip, which he formed with Robbie Muir, and Mathew Ransome and later Jeff Harford (of Bored Games). They released two EPs on the Flying Nun label. Later he formed Plagal Grind, with Robbie Muir, Jono Lonie, David Mitchell (of Goblin Mix and The 3Ds) and Peter Jefferies (of This Kind Of Punishment and Nocturnal Projections).

Galbraith's solo career has included numerous early cassettes and 7"s on Bruce Russell's (The Dead C) Xpressway label, as well as albums on labels such as Siltbreeze, Emperor Jones, Time Lag, Feel Good All Over and Table of the Elements. He has also recorded ten albums with Bruce Russell under the name A Handful of Dust.
In 1999, he began a collaboration with Matt De Gennaro when the two toured New Zealand Public Art Galleries converting them into giant soundboxes by stroking tensioned wires fixed to the buildings' structural supports.
In 2002, he designed and built a glass-tube fire organ, during an arts residency in Whanganui.
In 2006, he released Waves and Particles a collaboration with Maxine Funke (The Snares) and Mike Dooley (The Enemy, Toy Love, Snapper) as The Hundred Dollar Band. There was also the release of Long Wires in Dark Museums, Vol. 2 and the reissue of his early albums Morse/Gaudylight and Talisman by U.S. label Table of the Elements.
Later that year he was awarded an Arts Foundation of New Zealand Laureate Award and released Belsayer Time, a collaboration with Richard Youngs and Alex Neilson.
In 2007, Galbraith built a treadle-powered glass harmonium and released orb a solo album on his own Nextbestway label.

Discography
The Rip:
 1984 – A Timeless Peace EP (NZ Flying Nun Records)
 1987 – Stormed Port EP (NZ Flying Nun Records)

Plagal Grind:
 1990 – Plagal Grind EP (NZ Xpressway)

Solo:

Long Playng & Cassette
 1987 – Hurry on Down cassette (Xpressway)
 1992 – Morse (Siltbreeze)
 1995 – Talisman (NZ, Next Best Way)
 1998 – Mirrorwork (Emperor Jones)
 2000 – Cry (Emperor Jones)
 2007 – Orb (Next Best Way)
 2010 – Mass (Siltbreeze) (with Amiel Balester, Michael Kohler and David Kilgour)

Singles & EPs
 1989 – Timebomb – 7" with Graeme Jefferies – Xpressway – X/WAY 10
 1991 – Gaudylight – EP 7" – Siltbreeze – SB07
 1994 – Cluster – EP 7" – Ger. Raffmond  – RAFF 006-7
 1994 – Intro Version – EP 7" – Roof Bolt – RB001
 1995 – Orange Raja, Blood Royal – 7" – Walt Records – Walt 005
 1995 – Tae Keening – EP 77" with Demarnia Lloyd – Roof Bolt – RB003
 1996 – Split EP with Minimum Chips – 7" – Varispeed – VS02
 1997 – Rivulets – EP 7" – Camera Obscura – CAM 004S
 1998 – Wire Music – EP with Matt de Gennaro – Corpus Hermeticum – Hermes031
 1998 – Black Forest – EP – with Robert Scott
 1998 – Me & Gus – 7" – with Pip Proud – Emperor Jones – ej18
 1999 – Orbital – 7" – Crawlspace Records – SPACE 007
 1999 – Two Wires Violin Loop – EP – with Matt De Gennaro
 2000 – Long Wires in Dark Museums, Vol. 1 – EP with Matt De Gennaro – Emperor Jones – ej39cd
 2003 – Radiant  (with Constantine Karlis) (Emperor Jones)
 2006 – Long Wires in Dark Museums, Vol. 2 – EP with Matt De Gennaro – Xeric – XER-CD-103
 2006 – Belsayer Time EP with Richard Youngs and Alex Neilson – Time-Lag – Time-Lag 034
 2010 – Endless Black – EP – self-released
 2010 – Dances for the Blind Owl – EP – La Station Radar – fake tape serie #15
 2011 – Untitled 1–3 – 7" – Split EP with William Tyler

Compilations
 1993 – Seely Girn – Feel Good All Over – fgao #14

A Handful of Dust
(with Bruce Russell and Peter Stapleton):
 1993 – Concord LP (Twisted Village)
 1994 – The Philosophick Mercury CD (Corpus Hermeticum) 1994 (reissued on CD by No Fun Productions, 2008)
 1994 – The Eightness of Adam Qadmon TC (Corpus Hermeticum)
 1994 – Musica Humana CD (Corpus Hermeticum)
 1995 – From a Soundtrack to the Anabase of St.John Perse TC (Corpus Hermeticum) 1995 (reissued on LP by Bluesilver, 2000)
 1996 – Now Gods, Stand Up For Bastards CD (Corpus Hermeticum) 1996 (reissued on CD by No Fun Productions, 2008)
 1997 – Topology of a Phantom City TC (Corpus Hermeticum)
 1997 – Spiritual Libertines CD (Crank Automotive)
 1998 – Jerusalem, Street of Graves CD (Corpus Hermeticum)
 2002 – For Patti Smith CD (FreewaySound)
 2009 – Panegyric (Next Best Way)

The Hundred Dollar Band
(with Maxine Funke and Mike Dooley):
 2006 – Waves and Particles (Emperor Jones)

References

1965 births
Living people
Musicians from Dunedin
Dunedin Sound musicians
Galbraith,Alastair
People educated at Logan Park High School
Siltbreeze Records artists